Plantas alimentícias não convencionais, known by the acronym PANC, is an academic and popular movement in Brazil in favor of propagating and foraging for unconventional edible plants. The name, translating to Non-conventional Food Plants, refers to species with food potential that are not consumed on a large scale (such as Victoria amazonica), or to parts that are not usually consumed in common plants (such as sweet potato leaves).

History
Due to the advances in modern agriculture and changes in cuisine, some plants that were commonly grown or foraged are no longer used. Most PANCs are native species that are resistant to pests, need little care, and can be grown in unconventional places, such as roadsides or vacant lots.

The term PANC was coined by professor, researcher, and botanist Valdely Kinupp in his PhD thesis at the Federal University of Rio Grande do Sul. The term is variable, and a plant that is widely consumed within Brazil can be considered a PANC outside of it, and vice versa. This difference is also regional.

In 2010, the Brazilian Ministry of Agriculture released the Manual de hortaliças não convencionais (Manual of non-conventional vegetables). This book compiled 23 vegetable species with edible parts, and assists in the use and partial identification of PANCs.

Examples
Basella alba can be eaten sautéed, cooked or raw.
Maranta arundinacea has rhizomatous stems from which a starch can be extracted.
Tropaeolum majus is entirely edible above ground, including the seeds.

References

Agriculture in Brazil
Foraging
Agricultural economics